C. dentata may refer to:
 Castanea dentata, the American chestnut, a species in the beech & oak family found in North America
 Christella dentata, a small fern species found in Australia and on islands in the south Pacific Ocean
 Coelolepis dentata, a prehistoric jawless fish species
 Curetis dentata, a butterfly species
 Cyclemys dentata, the Asian leaf turtle, a turtle species

See also
 Dentata (disambiguation)